Gary Komarin (born 1951) is an American artist. Born in New York City, Komarin is the son of a Czech architect and Viennese writer.

Work and influences

Komarin is indebted to the New York School, especially his mentor Philip Guston with whom he studied at Boston University. According to a New York Times article by Barry Schwabsky, “Guston's lesson in cultivating the unknown has clearly stuck with Mr. Komarin. And on a more superficial level, the teacher's peculiar sense of form can also still be traced in his former student's work – in the way Mr. Komarin's bulbous forms can seem to echo, in an abstract way, the cigars, cyclopean heads and naked light bulbs in Guston's paintings.”

Komarin prefers non-art industrial canvas tarps and drop cloths as opposed to traditional painting media and materials. He builds layered surfaces with latex house paint mixed with spackle and water. The house paint offers hybrid colors that seem slightly ‘off’ and the spackle creates a matte surface. Kenneth Baker of the San Francisco Chronicle writes that “from these seemingly unlovely methods Komarin gets paintings that vibrate with historical memory, echoing such things as Matisse's driest most empty pictures, Robert Motherwell's spare abstractions of the 1970s, or the early New Mexico and Berkely paintings of Richard Diebenkorn.” Komarin's Cake paintings, which he has been painting since 1996 when he first showed them in New York, were written about by Sarah King for Art in America, who wrote, "Komarin's most successful works are serial such as Pop Art-like cake images, in which versions of a crudely outlined central image are repeated against a succession of subtle lyrical backgrounds."

Barry Schwabsky commented on Komarin's Cakes paintings:

Regarded thus in cognizance of abstraction, what's most important about Komarin's stacked motif, i.e. the Cakes, is the way it functions as an “armature” for the act of painting. Josef Albers didn't really have much to say about squares, but he appreciated them for the magic they allowed him to work with color. And as the title: Cake Stacked, Cornflower Blue on Creme, suggests, for Komarin too, color is entirely to the point! The ‘cake’ is a stable form, and the linear treatment of a legible image - along with the atmospheric treatment of the off white surround - allows for a different kind of balance between the painting's two colors than if they were used in purely abstract forms such as Alber's squares or Mark Rothko's more nebulous hovering color fields. The blue, quantitatively less than the surrounding creme, dominates and even, so to speak, invades it, whereas in another recent treatment of the same motif: Cake Stacked, Orange on Purple, the purple ground dominates, almost sucking the orange form into its own dense ether.

In real life, a cake might be ‘death by chocolate’ or angel cake, hazelnut or lemon. Knowing that it is a cake does not really say so much about what it will be like to eat it. Likewise, each of those painted cakes has its own flavor, its own feeling. One is delicate, another imposing, still the third is tough but moody. There is no repetition beyond the name and highly variable pictogram to which it is attached.

Describing Komarin's process of work in her essay for the 2012 catalog "The Road to Dialoro", Carol Diehl writes:For most artists there is no eureka moment; instead ideas develop through practice and over time, one thing leading to the next, and Gary Komarin is particularly sensitive to this intuitive process. If his marks appear awkward and childlike, it's because he has learned over the years how to turn off his internal critic and work from a place of detachment that allows for freshness, newness, and authenticity. Komarin has built into his working method ways of keeping himself from over-thinking or becoming too precious — techniques that allow him to get out of the way and almost let the painting paint itself. "When I have to become involved," he says, "is when it can feel burdensome." Komarin keeps things fresh and loose by doing several paintings at a time, working quickly on the floor on large squares of untreated, raw, canvas — sometimes even drop cloths — with big, inexpensive brushes and open buckets of latex enamel and other copious materials such as house paint or Spackle. There's an element of control, of course, but the paint may drip, splash or bleed in unexpected ways, gifts of accident that the artist may choose to keep or not. Those decisions, while still intuitive, draw on a stored knowledge base, a liftetime of observing and evaluating form, color, and line, so that when something happens, for better or worse, he recognizes it. Komarin sees this activity as a direct engagement with his materials, an exchange rather like collaboration, where he's not making something happen so much as encouraging it to happen. As he says, "I like to be surprised by my own work."Komarin has been invited to show in Dublin in a catalog exhibition titled 'States of Feeling' essay by John Daly. Works by Robert Motherwell, Gary Komarin, Sir Antony Caro and Larry Poons. In 2008, Komarin was invited to show a large cake painting at the Katonah Museum of Art in Katonah New York. This catalog exhibition was titled: ‘Here's the Thing: The Single Object Still Life” curated by Robert Cottingham. Komarin's work was included with works by: Andy Warhol, Christo, Claes Oldenberg, Richard Diebenkorn, Philip Guston, and other blue chips. Komarin has exhibited extensively throughout the United States, Europe and Asia. In 1996, Komarin's work was included in a pivotal exhibition at 41 Greene Street in New York City, along with work by Jean-Michel Basquiat, Philip Guston and Bill Traylor. In 2008, he had a solo museum exhibition at the Musee Kiyoharu Shirakaba in Japan. The exhibition and catalogue, Moon Flows Like a Willow, was orchestrated by the Yoshii Foundation in Tokyo with galleries in New York, Tokyo and Paris. Komarin was also invited to exhibit his Vessel grouping on paper at the privately owned Musee Mougins in Mougins, France. This museum is privately owned by one of Komarin's London collectors. Komarin's work has also been included in curated group shows in New York, Dubai, and Zurich along with works by Willem de Kooning, Mark Rothko, Jeff Koons, Yves Klein, and Joan Miró. Komarin has also exhibited in the past decade in catalog exhibitions in New York, Bogota, Zurich, Dubai, Paris, Palm Beach, Houston, San Francisco, Denver, Assisi and London.

Recognition

Komarin has been awarded the Joan Mitchell Prize in Painting, the New York Foundation for the Arts Grant in Painting, the Edward Albee Foundation Fellowship in Painting, the Elizabeth Foundation, New York Prize in Painting and the Benjamin Altman Prize from the National Academy of Design Museum, New York.

Articles and reviews of Komarin's work have appeared in the New York Times, Art in America and Arts Magazine among others. His work may be found in many museum, corporate and public collections including the Museum of Fine Arts, Houston; the Denver Art Museum, the Museum South Texas, Corpus Christi; the Montclair Art Museum; the Newark Museum; the Zimmerli Museum; the Yoshii Foundation, Tokyo; the Arkansas Museum of Contemporary Art; Boston University Museum of Fine Arts; the Microsoft Corporation; Blount International; the United Bank of Houston; the Hyatt Corporation; AT&T and American Airlines.

Over the course of the 2010s Komarin's work was collected by two privately-owned museums; the Musee Kiyoharu Shirabaka in Japan, and the Musee Mougins in same town in the south of France where Picasso lived and worked.

In October 2017, Komarin's "In Which the Barron Fallow" was inducted into the Galleria Nazionale d’Arte Moderna in Rome, Italy as part of their permanent collection.

In 2019, Komarin's painting, titled : “A Suite of Blue Sea, Lucinda, 72 x60” first exhibited at Galerie Baobob in Bogota, Colombia was acquired for permanent collection by MAMbo:  The Miuseum of Contemporary Art in Bogota. Recent exhibitions at MAMbo include works by Picasso,  de Kooning,  Francis Bacon and Jean Miro.

In 2020 Komarin was invited to show new paintings in a solo catalog / exhibition at the Dado Museum in Seoul, Korea. This was preceded by a solo exhibition at the Azjuelo Museum, also in Seoul, and inclusion as part an exhibition titled "Kinesis" at the Neon Gallery in London. In this same year, several of his paintings were added to the private collections of novelists Casey Maitlin and Martin Amis, respectively, as well as the writer Candace Bushnell. 

In 2021, one of Komarin's CAKE paintings was acquired for the permanent collection of the Museum of Contemporary Art San Diego, and in 2022 the Crocker Museum in Sacramento, California, acquired his "the Spanish Bride No. 7" for its permanent collection.

Komarin lives and works in Roxbury, Connecticut and keeps a pied–à–terre in New York City.

Exhibitions

References

Further reading
Alexander, Steven. (Idaho, 2007). "Zone of Continuity" essay. Gail Severn Gallery Catalog, "Mexican Thoughts."
Anonymous. (Japan, 2008). Untitled Essay. Foundation Musee Kiyoharu Shirakaba Catalog, "Moon Flows Like a Willow."
Diehl, Carol. (Houston, 2008). "The Mind and the Heart" essay. Gremillion & Co. Fine Art, Inc. Catalog, "Incident at Osbourne Grove."
Dobbins, Hamlet. (Zurich, 2003). Untitled Essay. Galerie Proarta Catalog, "Moon Flows Like a Willow."
Heller, J K. (Idaho, 2008). Untitled Essay. Gail Severn Gallery Catalog, "Blue Scrubbed White." 
Isak, Helga. (Zurich, 2006). "Inner Expressions essay. Galerie Proarta Catalog, Untitled. 
Komarin, Gary. (New York, 2011). Personal catalog, "Short Cakes/Stacked Cakes." 
Magnaguagno, Guido. (Zurich, 2011). "Don't Get The Blues" essay. Galerie Proarta Catalog, "Don't Get The Blues." 
Peters, Lisa, N. (New York, 2009). Untitled Essay. Spanierman Gallery Catalog, "Leandro and Luz."
Salk, Susanna. (Idaho, 2011). Q&A with Gary Komarin. Gail Severn Gallery Catalog, "She Watched the Night Revealing."
Schwabsky, Barry. (London, 2004). "When Paintings Hang Fire" essay. Tim Jeffries Catalog, "The Disappointed Mistress."
Schwabsky, Barry. (Dubai, 2010). "Finding the Edges" essay. Cuadro Fine Art Gallery Catalog, "Finding the Edges." 
Waltemath, John. (London, 2006). "The Bourdon Gauge" essay. The Fine Art Society Catalog, "The Bourdon Gauge."

External links
http://www.garykomarin.com/ Official Website
https://www.instagram.com/garykomarin/ Official Instagram

1951 births
Living people
Artists from New York City